Richard Paul Ebstein (born February 19, 1943) is an American behavioral geneticist. He is Professor in the Department of Psychology at the National University of Singapore, as well as Professor Emeritus in the Psychology Department  at Hebrew University. He is known for his research on the genetics of human social behaviors, such as political ideology, novelty seeking, and dancing.

References

External links

Place of birth missing (living people)
Living people
1943 births
American geneticists
Behavior geneticists
Academic staff of the National University of Singapore
Human geneticists
Union College (New York) alumni
Yale University alumni
Academic staff of the Hebrew University of Jerusalem